Wroe or WROE may refer to:

People
 Corban Wroe (born 1992), Australian basketball player
 James Wroe (1788–1844), radical English newspaper editor
 John Wroe (1782–1863), British evangelist 
 Nicky Wroe (born 1985), English soccer player
 Richard Wroe (1641–1717), English Christian preacher
 Sean Wroe (born 1985), Australian sprinter

Other
 Wroe Alderson (1898–1965), Marketing pioneer
 WROE-LP, a low-power radio station (95.7 FM) licensed to serve Roanoke, Virginia, United States
 WBDL-LD, a low-power television station (channel 18, virtual 8) licensed to serve Elk Mount, Wisconsin, United States, which held the call sign WROE-LP from 2010 to 2014
 WYDR, a radio station (94.3 FM) licensed to serve Neenah-Menasha, Wisconsin, which held the call sign WROE from 1971 to 2010